Ivette Jacqueline Ramírez Corral (born 25 January 1981) is a Mexican politician from the National Action Party. From 2008 to 2009 she served as Deputy of the LX Legislature of the Mexican Congress representing Sonora.

References

1981 births
Living people
Politicians from Sonora
Women members of the Chamber of Deputies (Mexico)
National Action Party (Mexico) politicians
21st-century Mexican politicians
21st-century Mexican women politicians
People from Ciudad Obregón
Sonora Institute of Technology alumni
Deputies of the LX Legislature of Mexico
Members of the Chamber of Deputies (Mexico) for Sonora